Syrinx aruanus, common name the Australian trumpet or false trumpet,  is a species of extremely large sea snail measuring up to 91 cm long and weighing up to 18 kg. It is a marine gastropod mollusk in the family Turbinellidae, and is the only species in the genus Syrinx.

This is the largest extant snail (shelled gastropod) species in the world, and arguably the largest (heaviest) gastropod in the world. Although the shell itself is quite well known to shell collectors because of its extraordinary size, little is known about the ecology and behavior of the species, except for one study about its feeding habits.

Taxonomy 

In 1681, Filippo Bonanni depicted this species in one of the first books ever published that was solely about seashells. The book was entitled: "Ricreatione dell' occhio e dela mente nell oservation' delle Chiociolle, proposta a' curiosi delle opere della natura, &c."

The taxonomic affinities of Syrinx aruanus were not properly understood for a long time. Until fairly recently it was placed in the family Melongenidae. A detailed taxonomic overview of this species was provided by Harasewych & Petit (1989).

Description 

This is the largest recent (as opposed to fossil) shelled gastropod, and the largest shelled gastropod by weight. (However, the largest shell-less gastropod or slug is Aplysia vaccaria, a giant sea hare known as the California black sea hare. The largest A. vaccaria has been measured at 99 cm in length and weighing in at almost 14 kg). An extremely large species of fossil gastropod is Campanile giganteum.

The overall height (also known as length) of the shell of S. aruanus is up to 91 cm (see also Hawaiian Shell News, 1982). The weight of the shell is about 1800 g.

The shell is usually pale apricot in color, however in life it is covered by thick brown or grey periostracum. The shell color can fade to a creamy yellow. The whole shell has a spindle-like shape. The spire of the shell is high. The whorls usually have a strong keel which can have nodules on it. The shell has a long siphonal canal. There are no folds on the columella, unlike some other genera within the same family.

Juvenile shells show a long tower-shaped protoconch or embryonic shell of 5 whorls, which is usually lost in the adult. This protoconch is about 2.5 cm long and looks so unlike the adult shell that it was described by George Washington Tryon in 1887 as a different species.

The weight of the animal (including the shell) can be up to 18 kg (40 lb). The radula of this species was described in detail by Wells et al. (2003).

Distribution 

This species occurs in the northern half of Australia and adjacent areas, including eastern Indonesia and Papua New Guinea.

Ecology 
These giant snails live on sandy bottoms in the intertidal zone and the sublittoral down to about 30 m. Where it has not been overfished, this snail is locally common. (Abbott & Dance, 1982)

This carnivorous species is specialized for feeding on polychaete worms in the genera Polyodontes (Acoetidae), Loimia (Terebellidae) and Diopatra (Onuphidae). It may seem unlikely for such a large gastropod to feed on worms, but worms in the family Acoetidae do include the largest polychaetes, with a length of over 1 meter. These worms live in tubes; Syrinx aruanus can reach them with its proboscis, which has a length of up to 250 mm.

Human uses 
This species is fished both for its very large shell and for its edible flesh, which is sometimes used as bait. The shell is sold for shell collections and is used as a source of lime. Another use of its shell is as a water carrier.

The Aboriginal Australian peoples who live on the Pennefather River in Queensland, use (or used) a half-moon shaped nose-pin known as an imina which is made from the shell of Syrinx aruanus. This nose pin is employed by men only; the women use a piece of grass instead. In order to make one of these nose pins, if the Syrinx shell is fresh, then it can be worked on right away, but if it is dried out, the shell is first soaked for two or three days in water. After this, a portion of the shell which is near the suture and the keel on the body whorl is chipped out using a stone, (see image), and then is ground down with water. The resulting rib-shaped object is used as the nose-pin.

See also 
 Triplofusus papillosus, the largest living sea snail species in the Americas

References
This article incorporates public domain text from reference.

Further reading 
 Kesteven H. L. (1904). "The anatomy of Megalatractus". Memoirs of the Australian Museum 4: 419–449.
 McClain C. R., Balk M. A., Benfield M. C., Branch T. A., Chen C., Cosgrove J., Dove A. D. M., Gaskins L. C., Helm R. R., Hochberg F. G., Lee F. B., Marshall A., McMurray S. E., Schanche C., Stone S. N. & Thaler A. D. (2015). "Sizing ocean giants: patterns of intraspecific size variation in marine megafauna". PeerJ 3: e715 .
 (1982). "Large Syrinx aruanus of shell length 36 inches (91.4cm) illustrated". Hawaiian Shell News 30(7): 12.

External links 

 Two images of shells with periostracum at:  
 More good quality images of shells here: 

Turbinellidae
Molluscs of the Pacific Ocean
Marine molluscs of Asia
Gastropods described in 1758
Taxa named by Carl Linnaeus